Early parliamentary elections were held in Austria on 24 November 2002, after internal divisions in the Freedom Party of Austria (FPÖ) culminating in the Knittelfeld Putsch led to the resignation of several leading FPÖ members. The result was a victory for the ÖVP, which won 79 of the 183 seats, the first time it had been the largest party in the National Council since 1966. It continued its coalition government with the FPÖ, which had lost almost two-thirds of its seats. Voter turnout was 84.3%.

Contesting parties 
The table below lists parties represented in the 21st National Council.

Results

Results by state

References

External links

Elections in Austria
Austria
Legislative
Austria